No Name is the only extended play recorded by singer-songwriter Sidhu Moose Wala, self-released on 25 April 2022 without prior announcement. Moose Wala also served as executive producer, while the tracks were produced by SOE, Snappy, JayB & Mxrci.

Background 
Sidhu announced the EP on his Instagram on 24 April 2022 and released the whole EP on 25 April 2022 on all streaming platforms.

Commercial performance 
The EP debuted on number 73 on the Billboard Canadian Albums and "Never Fold" debuted at number 97 on the Billboard Canadian Hot 100. "Never Fold" and "0 to 100" debuted on the Asian Music Chart (OCC) at number 9 and 20 respectively.

Track listing

Personnel 
 Sidhu Moose Wala – vocals, songwriter, executive producer
 Mr. Capone-E – featured artist
 AR Paisley – featured artist
 Sunny Malton – featured artist

Technical personnel 
 Mxrci – producer
 PixlPxl – engineer
 MusicByRass – engineer
 SOE – producer
 JAYB – producer
 Snappy – producer

Artwork
Nav Dhiman – Visuals

Charts

EP

Singles

References

External links

2022 debut EPs
Sidhu Moose Wala albums
Hip hop EPs
Contemporary R&B EPs